RNA journal may refer to:
RNA (journal), a Cold Spring Harbor Laboratory Press scientific journal
RNA Biology, a Landes Bioscience scientific journal